Jonathan Ruiz (born 1 June 1995) is an Aruban international football player.

External links 
 
 

1995 births
Living people
Association football midfielders
Aruban footballers
Aruba international footballers
SV Britannia players